"We Tell Ourselves" is a song co-written and recorded by American country music artist Clint Black. It was released in June 1992 as the first single from Black's album The Hard Way. The song reached number 2 on the Billboard Hot Country Singles & Tracks chart in August 1992, behind "Boot Scootin' Boogie" by Brooks and Dunn and also number-one on the RPM Country Tracks chart in Canada. It was written by Black and Hayden Nicholas.

Critical reception
Deborah Evans Price, of Billboard magazine reviewed the song favorably, saying that Black gives "an impassioned reading of these savvy, introspective lyrics about fooling yourself." She goes on to say that the tone of the production is "both imaginative and energetic."

Music video
The music video was directed by Michael Patterson and Candace Reckinger and premiered in mid-1992.

Chart performance

Year-end charts

References

1992 singles
Clint Black songs
Songs written by Clint Black
Songs written by Hayden Nicholas
Song recordings produced by Clint Black
Song recordings produced by James Stroud
RCA Records singles
1992 songs